Lat Sara (also Romanized as Lāt Sarā) is a village in Shabkhus Lat Rural District, Rankuh District, Amlash County, Gilan Province, Iran. After the 2006 census, it was determined that 142 people populate the village of Lat Sara and that 38 families reside there.

References 

Populated places in Amlash County